Agnes Howard Hall, also known as Ladies Hall or "Aggie," is a historic dormitory building located on the campus of West Virginia Wesleyan College at Buckhannon, Upshur County, West Virginia. It was built in 1895, and is a five-story brick building primarily used as a residence hall. It features an eclectic design with three tower caps and multiple hip roofs. An addition was completed in 1929 and extensive renovations occurred in 1952.  It contains 77 sleeping rooms and 26 main bathrooms, along with office areas for residence assistants, lounge areas, kitchen facilities, and maintenance storage rooms.  It was the first dormitory constructed at West Virginia Wesleyan College and the oldest on campus.  It was officially named Agnes Howard Hall in 1920, in memory of a young coed who had died while a student at Wesleyan.

It was listed on the National Register of Historic Places in 1983.

References

See also
National Register of Historic Places listings at colleges and universities in the United States

Residential buildings completed in 1895
Buildings and structures in Upshur County, West Virginia
Residential buildings on the National Register of Historic Places in West Virginia
Victorian architecture in West Virginia
West Virginia Wesleyan College
University and college buildings on the National Register of Historic Places in West Virginia
National Register of Historic Places in Upshur County, West Virginia